Korneyevka is a rural locality (a village) in Starokalkashevsky Selsoviet, Sterlibashevsky District, Bashkortostan, Russia. The population was 101 as of 2010. There is 1 street.

Geography 
Korneyevka is located 18 km east of Sterlibashevo (the district's administrative centre) by road. Chegodayevka is the nearest rural locality.

References 

Rural localities in Sterlibashevsky District